Oak Grove is the parish seat of West Carroll Parish in northeastern Louisiana, United States. The population was 1,441 at the 2020 United States Census.

Geography
Oak Grove is located at  (32.861361, -91.389043). Louisiana Highway 2 forms Main Street in Oak Grove.

According to the United States Census Bureau, the town has a total area of 1.7 square miles (4.5 km), of which 1.7 square miles (4.4 km) is land and 0.04 square mile (0.1 km) (1.15%) is water.

Demographics

2020 census

As of the 2020 United States census, there were 1,441 people, 652 households, and 384 families residing in the town.

2000 census
As of the census of 2000, there were 2,174 people, 792 households, and 517 families residing in the town. The racial makeup of the town was 69.23% White, 29.25% African American, 0.51% Native American, 0.14% Asian, 0.28% from other races, and 0.60% from two or more races. Hispanic or Latino of any race were 0.87% of the population.

There were 792 households, out of which 31.2% had children under the age of 18 living with them, 42.3% were married couples living together, 20.6% had a female householder with no husband present, and 34.6% were non-families. 32.3% of all households were made up of individuals, and 19.4% had someone living alone who was 65 years of age or older. The average household size was 2.46 and the average family size was 3.12.

In the town, the population was spread out, with 25.7% under the age of 18, 8.9% from 18 to 24, 21.8% from 25 to 44, 19.0% from 45 to 64, and 24.7% who were 65 years of age or older. The median age was 40 years. For every 100 females, there were 79.1 males. For every 100 females age 18 and over, there were 67.6 males.

The median income for a household in the town was $16,063, and the median income for a family was $20,729. Males had a median income of $22,708 versus $14,531 for females. The per capita income for the town was $10,183. About 33.2% of families and 39.4% of the population were below the poverty line, including 58.6% of those under age 18 and 21.3% of those age 65 or over.

Education
Public schools are operated by the West Carroll Parish School Board.

Oak Grove Elementary School serves grades Pre-Kindergarten to 6; Oak Grove High School, grades 7 to 12. The shared mascot is the tiger. Tiger football is one of the highlights of the fall season in Oak Grove, for the team reached the playoffs every year except one from 1979 to 2009.

Sports

Oak Grove Tigers Football 

7 Time State Champion
1989, 1991, 1999, 2001, 2019, 2020, 2022

Five Time State Runner-up
1964, 1986, 1997, 2004, 2018

Twenty-nine Time District Champion
1965, 1970*, 1971, 1975, 1979, 1986, 1988*, 1989, 1990, 1991, 1992, 1993, 1994, 1995*, 1998, 1999, 2000, 2003, 2004, 2005, 2006, 2008*, 2009, 2012, 2015, 2016, 2017, 2018, 2020

 Co-Champions

Festivals

Each March, The North Louisiana Gospel Weekend, formerly named for Dave L. Pearce, is held at the Thomas Jason Lingo Community Center in Oak Grove. The center  also hosts a Bluegrass festival each April and October.

The Poverty Point World Heritage Festival takes place the last week in March in downtown Oak Grove to celebrate West Carroll Parish as the home of Poverty Point World Heritage Site.  The Poverty Point Festival takes place in conjunction with the Spring North Louisiana Bluegrass Festival.

The North Louisiana Sweet Potato Festival takes place the first weekend of October in downtown Oak Grove to celebrate one of our most treasured crops, The Sweet Potato.  The event is sponsored by Lamb Weston and takes place in conjunction with the Fall North Louisiana Bluegrass Festival that is hosted at the Lingo Centre.  In April 2011, the West Carroll Chamber of Commerce launched the North Louisiana Sweet Potato Festival to celebrate the most popular crop in the parish.

Fiske Theatre 
The Fiske Theatre, named for its original owner, Donald Fiske, is located in downtown Oak Grove across from the West Carroll Parish Courthouse. It is the oldest operating movie theatre in northeast Louisiana and the last remaining single-screen facility. Donald Fiske built the first theatre in 1928. In 1951, he opened the new and current facility, for which he received the "Merit Badge" of the Exhibitor and Theatre Catalog for having the most modern and well-appointed theater in the nation.

The Fiske is open Thursday, Friday, and Saturday nights, with a Sunday-afternoon matinee. A different first-run feature is shown each week. Owned by the West Carroll Chamber of Commerce, the Fiske is operated by Holland Entertainment LLC.

The Fiske was added to the National Register of Historic Places, on 29 January 2014.

Media 

"The West Carroll Gazette" newspaper serves the Oak Grove Area

Gallery

References

External links
 Oak Grove Progress Community Progress Site for Oak Grove, LA

Towns in Louisiana
Towns in West Carroll Parish, Louisiana
Parish seats in Louisiana